9N  or 9-N may refer to :

9N or 9°N, the 9th parallel north latitude
 New York State Route 9N, a state highway in Eastern New York
 GCR Class 9N, a 1911 class of 4-6-2 tank locomotives
 The International Telecommunication Union prefix for radio stations in Nepal
 Nepal, aircraft registration code
 9N, a Ford N-Series tractor made from 1939 to 1941
 9N, a model of Fordson tractor
Gnome 9N, a model of Gnome Monosoupape
Lorraine 9N Algol, a model of Lorraine Algol
Typ 9n, internal corporate designation for Volkswagen Polo Mk4
2014 Catalan self-determination referendum, shortened to 9N due to being celebrated on November 9

See also
N9 (disambiguation)